The 2013–14 Leyton Orient F.C. season was the 115th season in the history of Leyton Orient Football Club, their 98th in the Football League, and eighth consecutive season in the third tier of the English football league system.

The club finished third in the league, reaching the end of the season promotion play-offs. They beat Peterborough United 3–2 on aggregate in the semi-final, but lost on penalties to Rotherham United in the final at Wembley Stadium on 25 May 2014, after drawing 2–2.

Playing staff
After his return from a loan period at Port Vale, Anthony Griffith was still a member of the squad for the first pre-season friendly at Chelmsford City and played in that match, but subsequently signed permanently for Port Vale.

Marvin Bartley first joined Leyton Orient on loan from Burnley on 1 August 2013, and made 23 appearances for the club, scoring two goals, before signing permanently on 31 January 2014.

Five goalkeepers
First choice goalkeeper Jamie Jones suffered an injury prior to the league game at Gillingham on 26 December, and was initially replaced by Jake Larkins. Larkins was inexperienced, however, and manager Russell Slade decided to bring in a more experienced goalkeeper to take over. Eldin Jakupovic was initially given the number 31 shirt when he arrived on loan from Hull City on 7 January 2014. He made four appearances before being recalled by Hull as cover when Allan McGregor was suspended for three matches. 

Orient then signed Ben Alnwick from Charlton Athletic, but he was sidelined with personal problems after one match. Subsequently, Shwan Jalal was signed on loan from A.F.C. Bournemouth and played twice before Jakupovic returned to Orient on 13 February, this time being given the number 30 shirt. Alnwick was subsequently released by mutual consent, and Jalal also left, before Jakupovic was again recalled after Hull's McGregor was injured. This left Orient with Jones, Larkins and England U18 goalkeeper Charlie Grainger, and Jones resumed his position in the first team.

Statistics include League, FA Cup, League Cup and Football League Trophy appearances and goals

Transfers

2013–14 squad statistics

Figures in brackets indicate appearances as a substitute
Players in italics are loan players

Top scorers

Results

Pre-season friendlies

League One

League One play-offs

Semi-final

Final

Results by round

FA Cup

League Cup

Football League Trophy

League One table

References

Leyton Orient F.C. seasons
Leyton Orient